Tubarão Futebol Clube, commonly known as Tubarão, is a Brazilian football club based in Tubarão, Santa Catarina state. They competed in the Série C three times.

History
The club was founded on May 25, 1992. Tubarão won the Copa Santa Catarina in 1998. They competed in the Série C in 1997, in 1998 and in 2002, they were eliminated in the First Stage in the three seasons.

Achievements

 Copa Santa Catarina:
 Winners (1): 1998

Stadium
Tubarão Futebol Clube play their home games at Estádio Aníbal Torres Costa. The stadium has a maximum capacity of 15,000 people.

References

Association football clubs established in 1992
Football clubs in Santa Catarina (state)
1992 establishments in Brazil